The ceremonial county of Bedfordshire currently comprises Bedford, Central Bedfordshire and Luton unitary authorities. From 1997, it has returned six MPs to the UK Parliament.

Number of seats 
The table below shows the number of MPs representing Bedfordshire at each major redistribution of seats affecting the county. 

1Prior to 1950, seats were classified as County Divisions or Parliamentary Boroughs. Since 1950, they have been classified as County or Borough Constituencies.

Timeline

Boundary reviews

See also 

 List of parliamentary constituencies in Bedfordshire

References 

Parliamentary constituencies in Bedfordshire